Mount Forde, also known as Boundary Peak 161, is a  mountain summit located in the Fairweather Range of the Saint Elias Mountains, on the Canada–United States border between southeast Alaska and British Columbia. Although modest in elevation, relief is significant since the mountain rises up from tidewater in less than four miles.

The mountain was named by the Geographical Names Board of Canada on December 4, 1928 for John Preston Forde, a surveyor and engineer with the Public Works Department of the Dominion of Canada, who visited Tarr Inlet in 1925 and 1928 to measure glacial recession. He was also the vice-president of the Alpine Club of Canada from 1910 through 1914, having made many ascents in the Canadian Rockies, Selkirk Mountains, and Coast Ranges. The mountain's name was officially approved by the United States Board on Geographic Names on January 9, 1929. Mount Forde can be seen from Tarr Inlet which is a popular destination for cruise ships. The months May through June offer the most favorable weather for viewing.

Climate

Based on the Köppen climate classification, Mount Forde has a subarctic climate with cold, snowy winters, and mild summers. Temperatures can drop below −20 °C with wind chill factors below −30 °C. This climate supports small hanging glaciers on its slopes as well as the larger Margerie Glacier to the south and Ferris Glacier to the north. Precipitation runoff and meltwater from its glaciers drains into Glacier Bay Basin.

See also

List of Boundary Peaks of the Alaska–British Columbia/Yukon border
Geography of Alaska
Geography of British Columbia

References

External links
 Weather forecast: Mount Forde

Mountains of Glacier Bay National Park and Preserve
Saint Elias Mountains
Landforms of Hoonah–Angoon Census Area, Alaska
Two-thousanders of British Columbia
Mountains of Alaska